The Palestinian ambassador in Pretoria is the official representative of the Palestinian government to the Government of South Africa.

List of representatives

References 

South Africa
Palestine
Ambassadors of the State of Palestine to South Africa